Doland may refer to:

 Doland, South Dakota, a city in Spink County, South Dakota, United States
 George Doland, a British businessman and Conservative politician
 James Doland, an Australian legislator

See also
 Dolan (disambiguation)
 Donald (disambiguation)